Rui Miguel Marcelino Tavares Pereira (born 29 July 1972), commonly known simply as Rui Tavares, is a Portuguese historian and politician. He has been elected a Member of the Assembly of the Republic in the 2022 legislative election, and has been a member of the Lisbon City Council since 2021.

Tavares is one of the founders and leaders of the green political party LIVRE, established in 2014. He had previously served as an independent Member of the European Parliament, elected in 2009 for the Left Bloc.

Early life and career 
Rui Tavares was born in Lisbon on 29 July 1972, to a bank clerk (and occasionally shepherd) father and a homemaker mother. Tavares had two older half-siblings (born of his father's first wedding; cut short when he became a widower) and two older siblings.

The family was originally from the small rural village of Arrifana, in Azambuja, in the Ribatejo Province, where Tavares spent part of his childhood. The area had a significant labour movement background, influenced by republicanism and anarcho-syndicalism in the early 20th century: the anti-clerical spirit of the First Portuguese Republic saw the local parish priest temporarily banished from the town and, unusually for the traditionally Catholic country, it then gained a significant Evangelical Baptist population. The Protestant denomination was indirectly introduced in the town by an atheist great-uncle of Tavares, who invited a Baptist pastor to the village to spite the Catholic hierarchy.

Living with his parents and his next older brother, Tavares attended primary school in Arrifana; of his much older siblings, his sister was already married at the time, and the two other brothers were attending university, one in Lisbon and the other in Czechoslovakia (sponsored by the Portuguese Communist Youth, of which he was a member). Tavares's next older brother attended secondary school in Azambuja and used to bring him books from the school library; by his own admission, Tavares was "bookish" ever since his mother taught him how to read, and he took great pride in having read The Adventures of Tom Sawyer and Huckleberry Finn at this time "as they should be read: perched up in a tree". He became interested in politics at around age 11 or 12, when he started reading anything he could on the different political ideologies at the Municipal Library in Penha de França, and became fascinated with anarchism and left-libertarianism.

Tavares earned a licentiate in History of Art from the Faculty of Social and Human Sciences of NOVA University Lisbon in 1994, a master's degree in Social Sciences from the Institute of Social Sciences of the University of Lisbon in 1998, and a doctorate in History from the École des hautes études en sciences sociales, in Paris, in 2014. He taught at university level for two years.

Political career 
He was elected Member of the European Parliament in 2009 for the Left Bloc.  In June 2011, Tavares became an independent within the Greens–European Free Alliance group. During his time at the European Parliament, he focused on refugee and fundamental rights issues.

Tavares Report 
In June 2013, he was commissioned by the European Parliament to submit a report on Hungarian constitutional concerns. The Tavares Report urged the Hungarian authorities "to implement as swiftly as possible all the measures the European Commission as the guardian of the treaties deems necessary in order to fully comply with EU law... [and with] the decisions of the Hungarian Constitutional Court and... the recommendations of the Venice Commission, the Council of Europe and other international bodies…".

LIVRE 

In 2014, he founded the new party LIVRE.

In the 2021 local elections, Tavares was elected member of the Lisbon City Council. Tavares had run alongside incumbent Mayor Fernando Medina on the electoral list of the "Mais Lisboa" coalition (Socialist Party and LIVRE), to be the councillor with the "Human Rights, Knowledge, Science, and Culture" portfolio on a Socialist-led City Council. The majority, however, was won by the "Novos Tempos" coalition (PSD/CDS–PP/Alliance/MPT/PPM); Tavares stated his intention to serve as opposition within the City Council to the new centre-right Mayor, Carlos Moedas.

Tavares was elected Member of the Assembly of the Republic in the 2022 legislative election for the Lisbon constituency. Tavares pledged to get António Costa, re-elected Prime Minister with an absolute majority, to work with other left-wing parties.

Footnotes

1972 births
Living people
People from Lisbon
Left Bloc MEPs
MEPs for Portugal 2009–2014
LIVRE politicians